Senele Dlamini (born April 1, 1992) is a Swazi swimmer, who specialized in freestyle and backstroke events. She represented her nation Swaziland at the 2008 Summer Olympics, finishing among the top 65 swimmers in the 50 m freestyle.

Dlamini received a Universality invitation from FINA to compete as a lone female swimmer for the Swaziland team in the 50 m freestyle at the 2008 Summer Olympics in Beijing. Swimming on the outside in heat four, Dlamini smashed the 28-second barrier to take the second spot with a personal lifetime best of 28.70, but fell behind the winner Ximene Gomes of Mozambique by more than half a second. Dlamini failed to advance to the semifinals, as she placed sixty-first overall out of ninety-two swimmers in the prelims.

References

External links
NBC 2008 Olympics profile

1992 births
Living people
People from Lobamba
Swazi female swimmers
Olympic swimmers of Eswatini
Swimmers at the 2008 Summer Olympics
Swazi female freestyle swimmers